Thrapston Town F.C. is an English football club based in Thrapston, Northamptonshire, and competes in the East Midlands Women's Football League .

History
The club was established in 1960 as Thrapston Ventura. They joined the Kettering Amateur League, winning the title in 1970–71, 1972–73, 1973–74, 1976–77 and 1977–78. In 1978 they moved up to Division Two of the United Counties League, finishing third in their first season and were subsequently placed in Division One after league restructuring. In 1996 the club adopted their current name. After finishing second in 2010–11, they were promoted to the Premier Division but finished bottom of the Premier League the next year, 2011–12 and were relegated back to Division One.
By season 2020/21 the club was playing in the Northamptonshire Combination. In 2022, the men's team folded and now the club consists of only Thrapston Town Ladies FC who play in the East Midlands Women's Regional Football League.

Honours
United Counties League Division One
Runners-up 1999–2000, 2010–11
Kettering Amateur League
Champions 1970–71, 1972–73, 1973–74, 1976–77, 1977–78

Records
FA Cup
First Qualifying Round 2011–12
FA Vase
First Round 2008–09, 2010–11

References

External links
Club website

Football clubs in England
Football clubs in Northamptonshire
United Counties League
Association football clubs established in 1960
1960 establishments in England
Thrapston